The Last Step is Ali Mosaffa's second feature film, following Portrait of a Lady Far Away (2005), featuring Leila Hatami, Ali Mosaffa, and Alireza Aghakhani. The screenplay was partly inspired by Leo Tolstoy's 1886 novella The Death of Ivan Ilyich and James Joyce's short story "The Dead". The film is considered one of the few independently produced features within Iranian cinema and gathered worldwide success after its world premiere at the 47th Karlovy Vary International Film Festival in July, 2012.

Awards
 Best Adapted Screenplay Ali Mosaffa from the 16th Iranian House of Cinema Film Festival, 2014
 FIPRESCI Prize for Best Film, Karlovy Vary International Film Festival 2012
 Crystal Globe Award for Best Actress Leila Hatami, Karlovy Vary International Film Festival 2012
 Crystal Simorgh for Best Adapted Screenplay, Ali Mosaffa, Fajr International Film Festival 2012
 Special Jury Prize at the Kerala International Film Festival 2012
 Award for Best Actor Alireza Aghakhani, Batumi International Art House Film Festival (BIAFF) 2012
 Piuculture Award at the Medfilm International Film Festival 2012

Reviews
 FIPRESCI-Karlovy Vary International Film Festival: Experiment in Narrative: The Last Step 
 The Hollywood Reporter: The Last Step: Karlovy Vary Film Review 
 IONCINEMA: The Last Step | American Film Institute Festival Review 
 American Film Institute Review: A Patchwork of Farce and Tragedy
 SBCC Film Reviews: The Last Step

External links
 
 Official Facebook Page
 Instagram

2012 films
Iranian drama films
Persian-language films